The Sporting Venus is a 1925 American silent romantic drama film directed by Marshall Neilan. The film was the second MGM release of Neilan, and starred his wife, actress Blanche Sweet, who allegedly sported the lowest waistline of 1925. This is the first of two feature films that paired Ronald Colman with Blanche Sweet, the second being His Supreme Moment, which was released in May 1925. This film is listed as being extant (surviving) at silentera database.

Plot
As described in a film magazine review, Scotch heiress Lady Gwendolyn is in love with a commoner, medical student Donald MacAllan, but the match is disapproved by her father. A misunderstanding develops and she has romance with the continental Prince Carlos, a nobleman who pretends to be wealthy. In an attempt to forget her unhappiness, she seeks diversion in famous watering places and other climes. Eventually she learns the true character of the nobleman and effects a reconciliation with Donald.

Cast

Reception
Life Magazine wrote "The Sporting Venus is typical of Neilan at his worst and at his best. It is foolish, inconsequential and spineless, and yet it is entertaining. ... If you look for rhyme or reason in The Sporting Venus, you will look in vain."

See also
Blanche Sweet filmography

References

External links

The Sporting Venus review at The New York Times

1925 films
Metro-Goldwyn-Mayer films
American silent feature films
1920s romance films
American black-and-white films
Films directed by Marshall Neilan
American romance films
1920s American films